Don Tomas or Don Tomás or Donn Thomas may refer to

Don Tomas, a value-priced brand of cigars made by General Cigar Company
Don Tomás Lagoon, a lagoon in Santa Rosa, La Pampa, Argentina
Don Tomás Urquidez (fl. 1853), California homesteader and builder of the first house in Hollywood; see

See also
Donald Thomas (disambiguation)